Freightquote, a C.H. Robinson company, is an online transportation broker of freight services throughout North America, based in Kansas City, Missouri. Their business provides comparisons of shipping rates for national and regional freight carriers.

Services

Freightquote developed a patented-technology platform to enable shippers to find competitive rates that can be compared for their freight shipments, similar to that which travel websites provide. Performed online, customers input freight shipment information online, review carrier options, choose a carrier, book shipments and pay for services. The company extends this platform through API connections. E-commerce websites integrate the company's technology to provide their customers with freight cost estimating and booking capabilities.

History
Tim Barton founded Freightquote in August 1998.

In December 2006, Great Hill Partners signed a deal to acquire a minority interest in the company.

C.H. Robinson acquisition 
In early 2015, Freightquote was acquired by C.H. Robinson, a third-party logistics firm based in Eden Prairie, MN, specializing in logistics and supply chain services, including freight transportation. The acquisition connects C.H. Robinson’s global supply chain services with the strong e-commerce presence and customer base of Freightquote.

References

Sources
 
 
 
  (video)
 
 
 Trucking in growth: Freightquote carries the revenue load by investing in service and technology - Kansas City Business Journal
 Freightquote.com buys Pennsylvania firm - Kansas City Business Journal

External links
 Freightquote on the Inc 5000 list 
 2006 Logistics Partner of the Year

Logistics companies of the United States
Transport companies established in 1998
Companies based in Kansas City, Missouri
1998 establishments in Kansas
Transportation companies based in Missouri
2015 mergers and acquisitions